Pacifique is the fourth studio album and soundtrack by the French duo Deep Forest released on December 12, 2000 by Sony Music / St George label. It mixes Pacific and island beats with electronic music. The music was written for the French film Le Prince du Pacifique, directed by Alain Corneau. The album was less successful than were its predecessors.

Track listing 
 "Pacifique" – 3:47 
 "La Légende Part 2" – 4:04 
 "Night Village" – 4:10
 "Le Réveil De Barnabé Part 1" – 1:07 
 "La Révolte" – 4:27
 "Le Baiser" – 2:30
 "Ouverture Huahiné" – 5:06
 "L'ile Invisible" – 1:45
 "La Legende Part 1" (French Edition Bonus Track) – 0:46
 "Exécution" – 4:26
 "Le Réveil De Barnabé Part 2" – 3:20 
 "Moon Light" – 3:21
 "Téfaora Ne Croit Pas À La Légende" – 1:10 
 "La Veuve Furieuse" – 3:34 
 "Huahiné Reggae" – 6:01
 "Huahiné Reggae Part 2" (Japanese Edition Bonus Track) – 2:05
 
The Japanese edition of this CD contains also multimedia features.
Track 8 is spelled incorrectly on the back insert, L'lle instead of L'île.

Credits
Written-By, Performer – Eric Mouquet, Michel Sanchez 
Engineering – Pierre Gamet 
Mastering, Mixing – Pierre Jacquot

References

External links 
 Details and samples from Pacifique

2000 albums
Deep Forest albums